Truro was the name of a parliamentary constituency in Cornwall represented in the House of Commons of England and later of Great Britain from 1295 until 1800, then in the Parliament of the United Kingdom from 1801 to 1918 and finally from 1950 to 1997.  Until 1885 it was a parliamentary borough, electing two members of parliament (MPs) by the plurality-at-large system of election; the name was then transferred to the surrounding county constituency, which elected a single Member by the first past the post system.  In 1997, although there had been no changes to its boundaries, it was renamed as Truro and St Austell, reflecting the fact that St Austell by then had a larger population than Truro.

Boundaries
1950–1974: The Borough of Truro, the Urban District of St Austell, the Rural District of Truro except the parish of Gwennap, and in the Rural District of St Austell the parishes of Creed, Grampound, Roche, St Dennis, St Ewe, St Goran, St Mewan, St Michael Caerhays, and St Stephen-in-Brannel.

1974–1983: The Boroughs of Truro, and St Austell with Fowey, the Rural District of Truro except the parish of Gwennap, and in the Rural District of St Austell the parishes of Creed, Grampound, Roche, St Dennis, St Ewe, St Goran, St Mewan, St Michael Caerhays, and St Stephen-in-Brannel.

1983–1997: The District of Carrick wards of Boscawen, Chacewater, Feock, Kea, Kenwyn, Moresk, Newlyn, Perranzabuloe, Probus, Roseland, St Agnes, St Clement, Tregolls, and Trehaverne, and the Borough of Restormel wards of Crinnis, Mevagissey, Poltair, Rock, St Ewe, St Mewan, St Stephen-in-Brannel, Trevarna, and Treverbyn.

History
The constituency has existed in a number of different forms. The constituency of Truro, up until 1885 elected two members to parliament; this was reduced to one.  In 1918 the constituency was abolished but it was recreated again in 1950.

The seat became a safe Lib Dem bet thanks to the popularity and eloquence of its former MP, David Penhaligon.  His death in a car crash, aged only 42, robbed the House of Commons of one of its most independent-minded and pragmatic members. His successor, Matthew Taylor, held the seat comfortably from a by-election in 1987, and remained its MP after the name change in 1997.

Members of Parliament

Truro Parliamentary borough

MPs 1295–1629 

 Constituency created (1295)

MPs 1640–1885

Truro County constituency

MPs 1885–1918

MPs 1950–1997

Elections

Elections in the 1830s

178 free burgesses polled for Lubbock and Tooke, and one for Scott and Peach, but their votes were rejected.

24 votes were tendered by inhabitant householders for Tooke and Willyams, but these were rejected.

Elections in the 1840s

  

  

Turner's death caused a by-election.

Elections in the 1850s

Elections in the 1860s
Montague Edward Smith resigned after being appointed a Judge of the Court of Common Pleas, causing a by-election.

  
 

  

 
  
 

Vivian was appointed a Lord Commissioner of the Treasury, causing a by-election.

Elections in the 1870s
Vivian resigned after being appointed Under-Secretary of State for War.

 

  

 

Williams' death caused a by-election.

Elections in the 1880s

Elections in the 1890s

Elections in the 1900s

Elections in the 1910s 

General Election 1914/15:

Another General Election was required to take place before the end of 1915. The political parties had been making preparations for an election to take place and by the July 1914, the following candidates had been selected; 
Liberal: Walter Burt
Unionist:

Elections in the 1950s

Elections in the 1960s

Elections in the 1970s

Elections in the 1980s

Elections in the 1990s

See also
 List of parliamentary constituencies in Cornwall

References

Further reading
Robert Beatson, A Chronological Register of Both Houses of Parliament (London: Longman, Hurst, Res & Orme, 1807)
D. Brunton & D. H. Pennington, Members of the Long Parliament (London: George Allen & Unwin, 1954)
Cobbett's Parliamentary history of England, from the Norman Conquest in 1066 to the year 1803 (London: Thomas Hansard, 1808)
F. W. S. Craig, British Parliamentary Election Results 1832–1885 (2nd edition, Aldershot: Parliamentary Research Services, 1989)
 Maija Jansson (ed.), Proceedings in Parliament, 1614 (House of Commons) (Philadelphia: American Philosophical Society, 1988)
 Lewis Namier & John Brooke, The History of Parliament: The House of Commons 1754–1790 (London: HMSO, 1964)
 J. E. Neale, The Elizabethan House of Commons (London: Jonathan Cape, 1949)
Henry Stooks Smith, The Parliaments of England from 1715 to 1847 (2nd edition, edited by FWS Craig – Chichester: Parliamentary Reference Publications, 1973)
 Frederic A. Youngs jr, Guide to the Local Administrative Units of England, Vol II (London: Royal Historical Society, 1991)
  The History of Parliament Trust, Truro, Borough from 1386 to 1868

Constituencies of the Parliament of the United Kingdom established in 1295
Constituencies of the Parliament of the United Kingdom disestablished in 1918
Constituencies of the Parliament of the United Kingdom established in 1950
Parliamentary constituencies in Cornwall (historic)
Constituencies of the Parliament of the United Kingdom disestablished in 1997
Politics of Truro